Víctor Hugo Arévalo Jordán (born December 23, 1946 in Cochabamba) is a Bolivian writer and noted university professor.

Biography 
At the age of four, he moved with his parents to La Paz, where he lived until 1982, when for family reasons he settled in the city of Santa Fe, Argentina.

Notable works 
Los Augures
La Puerta
Réquiem
La última sinfonia del mago
Soledad, hoy me rompieron el ojete
La noche de los elegidos
Recuerdos y silencios
Geometrías del dolor
Recuerdos y silencios
Testimonio
Génesis

References

External links
Novelas de Arévalo Jordán 
Poemas de Victor Hugo 

Bolivian male poets
Bolivian novelists
Male novelists
People from Cochabamba
1946 births
Living people